Uspensky Pogost is a rural locality (a village) in Paustovskoye Rural Settlement, Vyaznikovsky District, Vladimir Oblast, Russia. The population was 72 as of 2010.

Geography 
Uspensky Pogost is located on the left bank of the Suvoroshch River, 21 km south of Vyazniki (the district's administrative centre) by road. Borodino is the nearest rural locality.

References 

Rural localities in Vyaznikovsky District
Vyaznikovsky Uyezd